RadiumOne is a marketing company that provides online display, mobile, video, and social advertising services through programmatic marketing campaigns. It was first launched in 2009 by Gurbaksh Chahal. The company buys advertising space from websites and mobile applications and resells it in targeted packages to advertisers and agencies. It also creates software that automates the process of media buying for digital marketers. Headquartered in San Francisco, the firm has offices across North America, Europe and Asia.

History
The company was launched in 2009 by Gurbaksh Chahal as gWallet, a loyalty and rewards program. After CEO Gurbaksh Chahal pleaded guilty to domestic violence battery on April 23, 2014, there were calls for him to step down as CEO. He was fired and immediately replaced by COO Bill Lonergan on April 27, 2014.

RadiumOne utilizes data taken from social networking sites such as Twitter and Facebook and uses it to tailor online, video, social and mobile consumer advertising using real-time bidding. The startup had initially raised $33.5 million from venture capital funds.

In June 2017, RhythmOne acquired the assets of data-driven marketing platform RadiumOne for US$22m.

References

Further reading

External links
 

Companies based in San Francisco
Online advertising services and affiliate networks
Digital marketing companies of the United States
Marketing companies established in 2009
2009 establishments in California
Business services companies disestablished in 2017
2017 disestablishments in California
Defunct marketing companies of the United States
2017 mergers and acquisitions